The Astor Theatre is a classic, single-screen revival movie theatre located in the inner Melbourne suburb of St Kilda, that has a long and illustrious history. The site at 1-3 Chapel Street was first used for public entertainment in 1913 when Thomas Alford established the Diamond Theatre, which shared the site with a confectioner and livery stables. Part vaudeville theatre and part cinema, in 1914 it was renamed the Rex before closing in 1917. By 1924 the site had been occupied by a motor garage.

History
In 1935 Alford sold the property to Frank O'Collins. After council approval was received in October, demolition of the site's original buildings commenced in December. Construction began shortly afterwards, O'Collins having commissioned architect Ron Morton Taylor (whose earlier work included involvement on the State Theatre) and construction firm Clements Langford. Work progressed rapidly and the new Astor Theatre was officially opened on 3 April 1936.

The design of the theatre is in the Art Deco style typical of the time. Notably it was one of the last theatres in Melbourne to use the traditional two-level auditorium layout; the stall-and-circle arrangement falling out of favour for its cost during the post-war years. Originally it had a seating capacity of 1,673 people.

The theatre has changed ownership several times, undergone redesign and survived redevelopment proposals to remain a Melbourne landmark venue.
 The Astor Theatre is listed on the Victorian Heritage Register, under record number H1751. It is also one of the rare contemporary theatres that consistently maintains the tradition of showing Double feature screenings for the price of single films.

In 1983, The Astor Theatre was leased by George Florence, who ran the business until early 2015. Florence developed the programming style of The Astor, and the format of its quarterly calendar of forthcoming films. In 2007 the nearby St Michael's Grammar school paid $3.8 million for it at auction, retaining Florence and his programming, using only occasionally. In August 2012, St Kilda businessman Ralph Taranto bought the Astor for an undisclosed sum believed to be less than the amount St Michael’s paid. He intended to leave the running of the cinema in the hands of Florence. When asked if his intention was to keep it as a single-screen cinema, Taranto's response was simple: Oh God yes. I wouldn't buy it otherwise.

On 23 August 2014 it was announced that the Astor would close in early 2015, when Palace Cinemas agreed to become the new tenant with the intent to 'continue business largely as it is', according to The Age. Palace announced that the cinema will reopen as is in June 2015 after some minor renovations to the candy bar. The Astor is currently managed by Zak Hepburn.

References

External links

 Current location of The History Of The Astor Theatre

Art Deco architecture in Melbourne
Cinemas in Melbourne
Culture of Melbourne
Organisations based in Melbourne
1936 establishments in Australia
St Kilda, Victoria
Buildings and structures in the City of Port Phillip
Heritage-listed buildings in Melbourne